Konglak Haphong or Konglak Hill is one of the most popular tourist spots in Bangladesh, situated among the hills in Sajek Union, Baghaichhari Upazila in Rangamati District. The valley is 1800 feet above sea level.

Location

Konglak Haphong located in Sajek Valley which is the highest peak of Sajek. This hill located in Sajek Union located in the north of Chittagong Hill Tracts. It is under Baghaichori Upazila in Rangamati hill district. On the top of this are the villages of Haphong, Konglak Kami, or Konglak Para located where indigenous people live.

Gallery

References

Rangamati Hill District
Tourist attractions in Bangladesh